Cyclops UK are global leaders in accurate and up-to-date safety camera data. The world’s biggest vehicle and navigation brands rely on us to help drivers reduce their speed to make our roads safer for everyone.

The team of expert surveyors and researchers ensure that clients have access to the most reliable and trusted precision safety camera data – whether it be red light, average speed cameras or regular mobile zones. Cyclops UK Ltd currently track and alert drivers to all types of safety and average speed cameras in 63 countries and territories.

History 
Cyclops UK have been providing safety camera data for 20 years. The team are experts in dynamic software and content.

In 2001 the eponymous company, Cyclops UK Ltd, become the global distributor and subsequently acquired all the intellectual property rights in the product, software and databases from Trafficmaster plc.® (the UK traffic information company).

The Cyclops device was sold in volume by Halfords, Motor World, Peugeot, Citroen, Nissan, Alfa Romeo and Ford as an aftermarket product.

In 2003-2004, investments were made by Octopus Ventures, East Midlands Business Angels and Catapult Venture Managers to further fund development.

In 2010, Cyclops UK launched a new real-time alert service using the "3G/GPRS" connectivity of mobile phones and connected personal navigation devices to enable a community of users to share information on the activity of mobile speed camera enforcement. A team of internal researchers added foreseen location information from local official agencies. In the UK, such agencies include the Safer Roads Partnership that manage such programs on behalf of local councils and police forces.

The service is currently available as an App on iPhone for the UK.

Technology 
Cyclops uses a unique system of digital way-points in its database-creation-process to eliminate non-relevant alerts. Other camera alert systems often use a radius or cone look-up based on a vehicle's heading that can generate false alerts in some instances.

The system filters user reports against historic, frequent and clusters of current reported data to derive a "risk" rating for each report. Only alerts that have an appropriate score are forwarded to users. A similar system is also used by traffic information systems to help predict traffic patterns.

Reception 
UK motoring journalist Quentin Willson described the Cyclops Speedwatch system as a "must have app" in his Sunday Mirror column on 28 November 2011. Leading UK consumer motoring magazine, Auto Express, featured Cyclops Speedwatch as its "app of the week" in its 24 November 2011 edition.

Official agencies such as Thames Valley Safer Roads Partnership have described the Cyclops system as an "aid to safer driving on our roads".

In 2021 a long-term Cyclops partner quoted, "The Cyclops database helps support driver awareness and continues to encourage the safety for our mutual customers.”

Partnerships 
Cyclops UK is a long standing supplier to Garmin, the largest satellite navigation brand in the world. All Garmin satellite navigation units come pre-loaded with Cyclops content.

The databases provided by Cyclops are found in millions of satellite navigation devices and mobile navigation device across the world and the company.

The company logo and strap-line "powered by Cyclops" appear on millions of satellite navigation boxes every year.

Marketing 
Since 2001 the company began using the strap-line "keeping an eye on the road ahead" to represent its focus on helping drivers to drive safely within the speed limit.

In 2021, the company rebranded, with a new look, the messaging behind the brand and the strap-line remained the same. Cyclops UK have created more emphasis on how they help make journeys safer for all.

References

External links 
 details on coverage, technology and collection processes
 company information here and information on waypoint technology system
 information on real-time live camera alert community based system
 interview with Cyclops MD on real-time live service with Ludovic Privat, Editor of GPSBusinessNews

Companies established in 2001
Companies based in Banbury